Wayne Wiblin (born 13 February 1969) is a South African former cricketer. He played in 44 first-class and 43 List A matches from 1991/92 to 2001/02.

References

External links
 

1969 births
Living people
South African cricketers
Border cricketers
Eastern Province cricketers
People from Makhanda, Eastern Cape
Cricketers from the Eastern Cape